was a Japanese rakugo comedian best known for hosting the Shōten comedy show on Nippon TV. His comedic career spanned several decades.

He was born  and at the time used Enraku as his stage name. He was known using the Japanese comedic style of rakugo, in which a single performer or storyteller appears on stage and tells comedic stories to the audience. Enraku's last public rakugo performance took place at the National Engei Hall in Tokyo in February 2007.

Sanyutei Enraku died of lung cancer on October 29, 2009, at the age of 76.

References

1932 births
2009 deaths
Deaths from lung cancer
Rakugoka
20th-century comedians